Strage degli Innocenti or La Strage degli Innocenti may refer to:

Literature
, a 1631 poem by Giambattista Marino

Music
, a 1682 oratorio by Giovanni Buonaventura Viviani
, a 1900 oratorio by Lorenzo Perosi
, a cantata by Marcello Abbado

Paintings
, a painting in Siena Cathedral, probably by Matteo di Giovanni in 1481
, a 2020 painting by Giuseppe Veneziano

See also
Massacre of the Innocents, in the Gospel of Matthew